Zavkhan River is a river in Mongolia. The river forms most of the border between the Govi-Altai and Zavkhan aimags.

See also 
List of rivers of Mongolia

References

Rivers of Mongolia